Markus Stockhausen (born May 2, 1957) is a German trumpeter and composer. His recordings and performances have typically alternated between jazz and chamber or opera music, the latter often in collaboration with his father, composer Karlheinz Stockhausen.

Biography
Born in Cologne, West Germany, he is the son of composer Karlheinz Stockhausen. At age four he appeared as "child at play" in his father's theatre piece Originale. He received his first piano lessons at age six, and at age twelve he began to play the trumpet. He attended the music secondary school in Cologne.

Concerts and festival appearances, also for the Goethe Institute, have taken him around the world. In November 2008 he gave the first performance of Freedom Variations, a composition for trumpet and chamber ensemble written by Italian composer Lorenzo Ferrero.

The Markus Stockhausen Group (with Jeroen van Vliet p, Christian Thomé dr, Jörg Brinkmann cello) released on 27 August 2021 the album Tales.

Discography
 Aparis (ECM, 1990)
 Cosi Lontano...Quasi Dentro (ECM, 1989)
 Köln Musik Fantasy (1991)
 Stockhausen: Michaels Reise (ECM, 1992)
 Despite the Fire-Fighters' Efforts... (Polygram/ECM/Universal, 1993)
 New Colours of Piccolo Trumpet (EMI Classics, 1993)
 Stockhausen: Oberlippentanz; Ave; Tierkreis (Trio-Version) (Stockhausen-Verlag, 1993)
 Stockhausen: Aries; Klavierstück XIII (Stockhausen-Verlag, 1994)
 Clown (EMI, 1995)
 Possible Worlds (CMP, 1995)
 Cologne Music Fantasy (Largo, 1996)
 Sol Mestizo (ACT, 1996)
 Markus Stockhausen Plays Karlheinz Stockhausen (EMI Classics, 1998)
 Solo I (Aktivraum, 2000)
 Still Light (MA, 2000)
 In Deiner Nahe (aka Close to You) (Aktivraum, 2001)
 Karta (ECM, 2001)
  Joyosa (Enja, 2002)
 Lichtblick: Prima, Altrove... (Aktivraum, 2004)
 Nonduality (Aktivraum, 2004)
 Thinking About (Aktivraum, 2004)
 Mozart, La Nuit Jazz 'n' Groove (Nocturne, 2005)
 Es War Einmal...Instanti Infiniti (Aktivraum, 2007)
 Streams (Enja, 2007)
 Abendglühen (Aktivraum, 2008)
 Electric Treasures: Live in Bonn (Aktivraum, 2008)
 No Matter (Metastation, 2008)
 Symbiosis: Werke von Markus Stockhausen für Klarinette und Trompete und Streichorchester (Aktivraum, 2008)
 Other Presences (Sargasso, 2008)
 Symphonic Colours (2009)
 Spaces & Spheres: Intuitive Music (Wergo, 2013)
 Markus Stockhausen and the Metropole Orkest (Intuition, 2013)
 Atlas (2015)
 Alba (ECM/Universal, 2016)
 Hamdelaneh - Intimate dialogues (with Alireza Mortazavi) (Dark Companion, 2019)
 Markus Stockhausen Group: Tales (o-tone music, 2021)

As sideman
With Rainer Brüninghaus
 Continuum (ECM, 1983)
With Ralph Towner
 City of Eyes (ECM, 1988)
With Lebowski
 Goodbye My Joy (Lebowski, 2013)
With Gaspare Bernardi
 Stranger at home (Incipit/Egea, 2018)

References

Sources
Sanz, Pablo (2006). "Markus Stockhausen, una mirada fuera de plano". Scherzo: Revista de música 21, no. 210 (July–August): 136–37.
Tarr, Edward H. (2001). "Stockhausen, Markus". The New Grove Dictionary of Music and Musicians, second edition, edited by Stanley Sadie and John Tyrrell. London: Macmillan Publishers.

External links

 
 

1957 births
Living people
German jazz trumpeters
Male trumpeters
Jazz trumpeters
Post-bop trumpeters
EMI Classics and Virgin Classics artists
Avant-garde trumpeters
Musicians from Cologne
Hochschule für Musik und Tanz Köln alumni
German male jazz musicians
ECM Records artists
ACT Music artists
Okeh Records artists
Enja Records artists